Bertram Theodore Bailey (5 December 1874 – 13 October 1964) was an Australian cricketer. He played eight first-class matches for South Australia between 1896/97 and 1901/02.

See also
 List of South Australian representative cricketers

References

External links
 

1874 births
1964 deaths
Australian cricketers
South Australia cricketers
Cricketers from Adelaide